Bachelor Mountain is a mountain located in Linn County, Oregon.

Bachelor Mountain is in the Willamette National Forest and stands 5,953 ft above sea level (1,814 m). It is located next to Coffin Mountain. Bachelor Mountain is best known for having a trail to hike to the top. Like Coffin Mountain, it has views of the Cascade Mountain Range. The mountain used to have a fire lookout.

References

Mountains of Oregon
Mountains of Linn County, Oregon